Direct Support Professionals (DSPs) are people who work directly with people with physical disabilities, intellectual disabilities, or developmental disabilities with the aim of assisting the individual to become integrated into his/her community or the least restrictive environment.

A direct support professional is a person who assists an individual with a disability to lead a self-directed life and contribute to the community, assists with activities of daily living if needed,  and encourages attitudes and behaviors that enhance community inclusion. A DSP may provide supports to a person with a disability at home, work, school, church, and other community places. A DSP also acts as an advocate for the disabled individual, in communicating their needs, self-expression and goals.

Willowbrook State School

Direct Support Professional training and community placement/living became more prevalent following the Willowbrook State School scandal where it was uncovered following an investigation by then WABC journalist Geraldo Rivera, that residents were being physically mistreated and kept in poor living conditions. Telly Award-winning film Everyday Heroes, produced by Pleasantville, New York media production company Creators Media Group, highlights the work of Direct Support Professionals.

Lack of national standard of care
As of May 2006 Michigan and 5 other states were gearing up to implement fingerprinting background checks for Direct Support Professionals that provide care in long-term care facilities.  Some states, such as California and New York, require criminal background checks, while other states do not.

California direct support professional training 

The requirement for the community care facility direct care staff training (a.k.a. Direct Support Professional Training) was created by Assembly Bill 2780 enacted in 1998. AB 950, approved by the Governor in August 2001, amends the Welfare and Institutions Code. Effective January 1, 1999, the Department of Developmental Services implemented mandated statewide competency-based training for direct support professionals employed in regional center vendored community care facilities.  This legislation followed a series reported by the San Francisco Chronicle on poorly trained staff and a high death rate for developmentally disabled people in the State of California.

In 1998, the California legislature established the Direct Support Professional (DSP) Training Program.
The purpose of the program is to increase quality of care for people with developmental disabilities living in licensed community care facilities by ensuring core competencies or skills for all direct support professionals.

The statewide training program requires all direct support professionals to successfully complete 70-hours of training over two years, or pass a challenge test for each of two, 35-hour training segments. Upon successfully completing either of these requirements, Direct Support Professional Certification will be provided.

The DSP requirements are not in place for DDN or DDH facilities under the Department of Health Services of the State of California.  These requirements are also not in place for day programs, work activity centers or for at home vendored service providers.
State of California On-line Resources/Community Care Facility – Direct Support Professional Training Program
DSP Training Material: Year 1 and Year 2
Regional Occupational Centers and Programs (ROCPs) Information, including curriculum, for those Regional Occupational Centers and Programs (ROCP) that offer required training necessary for individuals to work in community care licensed facilities.
Los Angeles County Regional Occupational Program, DSP Training and resources links.

Virginia DSP
Direct Support Professional Training through the College of Direct Support

Louisiana DSP
Louisiana Direct Support Professionals

Illinois DSP
Illinois Council on Developmental Disabilities – The Illinois project has been reviewing options for retention and training since 2003 with a projected outcome of having trained Direct Care Professional and retention once trained.

Tennessee DSP
Direct Support Professionals Association of Tennessee

Kansas DSP
The Kansas Chapter of the National Alliance for Direct Support Professionals

National Alliance for Direct Support Professionals
National Alliance for Direct Support Professionals –
Offers Training and National Standards.  Some standards may be higher than the National Alliance depending on the state.

See also
Caregiver
Friendly caller program

References

San Francisco Chronicle Series
California State Assembly Bill 2780
Federal Level: H.R. 1279 – Direct Support Professionals Fairness and Security Act of 2007

External links
Illinois Council on Developmental Disabilities
College for Direct Support Professionals
WhoWillCare.net, H.R. 1279 – Direct Support Professionals Fairness and Security Act of 2007 Advocacy and Awareness
YouNeedToKnowMe.org – H.R. 1279 – Direct Support Professionals Fairness and Security Act of 2007 Advocacy and Awareness
www.collegeofdirectsupport.com

Caregiving
Disability in the United States
Social care in the United States
Personal care and service occupations
Professionals